The NCAA Men's Division III Swimming and Diving Championships comprise an annual swim meet to determine the team and individual national champions of men's NCAA Division III collegiate swimming and diving in the United States.

It has been held at the same time and place as the NCAA Women's Division III Swimming and Diving Championships each year since 1982.

The most successful program is Kenyon, who has won 34 national titles. Kenyon's 34 titles are the most by any collegiate program in one particular sport at any NCAA division. Kenyon's thirty-one consecutive titles, from 1980 until 2011, is also an all-division record.

The Lords won their record thirty-fourth national title in 2015.

Results

Champions

Team

 Schools highlight in yellow have reclassified to another NCAA division.

Championship records

|-bgcolor=#DDDDDD
|colspan=9|
|-

|-bgcolor=#DDDDDD
|colspan=9|
|-

|-bgcolor=#DDDDDD
|colspan=9|
|-

|-bgcolor=#DDDDDD
|colspan=9|
|-

|-bgcolor=#DDDDDD
|colspan=9|
|-

|-bgcolor=#DDDDDD
|colspan=9|
|-

See also
NCAA Women's Division III Swimming and Diving Championships
NCAA Men's Division I Swimming and Diving Championships
NCAA Men's Division II Swimming and Diving Championships
NAIA Men's Swimming and Diving Championships
List of college swimming and diving teams

References

External links
NCAA Division III Men's Swimming and Diving Page

Swimming And Diving, Men's
Swimming competitions in the United States
Recurring sporting events established in 1975